Brenda León Romano (born 8 September 1993) is a Mexican footballer who plays as a defensive midfielder for Liga MX Femenil club Club Necaxa (women) and the Mexico women's national team.

International career
León made her senior debut for Mexico on 11 March 2020 in a 0–0 friendly draw against the Czech Republic.

References

External links 
 

1993 births
Living people
Women's association football midfielders
Mexican women's footballers
Footballers from Tlaxcala
People from Tlaxcala City
Mexican people of Italian descent
Mexico women's international footballers
Liga MX Femenil players
Lobos BUAP footballers
Cruz Azul (women) footballers
21st-century Mexican women
20th-century Mexican women
Mexican footballers